The 2008–09 Worthington's District Cup is the national Rugby Union district cup competition of Wales. It is the 36th annual Welsh Districts cup. The current champions are Cambrian Welfare RFC (2 times 1996–97, 2007–08). This was the last Welsh District Cup as the WRU instated all remaining WDRU (Welsh Districts Rugby Union) clubs with full WRU membership.

2007-08 final
The 2007-08 Final took place at the Millennium Stadium, Cardiff on 12 April. The final was competed between Cambrian Welfare RFC and Bryncethin RFC (both teams from WRU Division 6 Central). The final score was 20 - 8 to Cambrian Welfare RFC who won the competition for the second time.

Calendar

Matches

Round 1

Round 2

Round 3

Round 4

Finals

Quarter-finals

Semi-finals

Final

References

Worthington's District Cup
Worthington's District Cup